Vazquezitocoris is a genus of leaf-footed bugs in the family Coreidae. There are about 14 described species in Vazquezitocoris.

Species
These 14 species belong to the genus Vazquezitocoris:

 Vazquezitocoris abancayanus Brailovsky, 1990
 Vazquezitocoris aequilus Brailovsky & Barrera, 2012
 Vazquezitocoris andinus Brailovsky, 1990
 Vazquezitocoris aricanicus Brailovsky, 1990
 Vazquezitocoris catamarcanus Brailovsky, 1990
 Vazquezitocoris certus Brailovsky & Barrera, 2012
 Vazquezitocoris decoratulus Brailovsky, 1990
 Vazquezitocoris inflexicollis (Blöte, 1935)
 Vazquezitocoris micropterum Brailovsky, 1990
 Vazquezitocoris oroquensis Brailovsky, 1990
 Vazquezitocoris peruvianus Brailovsky, 1990
 Vazquezitocoris putrenus Brailovsky & Barrera, 2012
 Vazquezitocoris repletus (Van Duzee, 1925)
 Vazquezitocoris schuhi Brailovsky & Barrera, 2012

References

Further reading

 
 

Articles created by Qbugbot
Coreini
Coreidae genera